Sundatheria is a proposed clade of placental mammals. It includes the orders Scandentia and Dermoptera. An alternative phylogeny is the Primatomorpha hypothesis.

References 

 

Mammal unranked clades